The  is a national expressway in the Chūbu region on the island of Honshū in Japan. It is managed by Central Nippon Expressway Company. The route is signed E41 under the Ministry of Land, Infrastructure, Transport and Tourism's  "2016 Proposal for Realization of Expressway Numbering."

Overview

Tōkai and Hokuriku are the names of the two regions of Japan that are linked by the expressway.

The expressway begins at a junction with the Meishin Expressway to the northwest of the Nagoya urban area and follows a northerly course into Gifu Prefecture, passing the capital Gifu and heading further north into the mountainous Hida region. The expressway also passes by Shirakawa-gō and Gokayama, two UNESCO World Heritage Sites straddling the border between Gifu Prefecture and Toyama Prefecture. The expressway continues north through western Toyama Prefecture to its terminus at a junction with the Hokuriku Expressway and the Nōetsu Expressway.

The first section of the expressway was opened to traffic in 1986. The final section of the expressway (25 km between Hida-Kiyomi Interchange and Shirakawagō Interchange) was opened on July 5, 2008. A major component of this section is the Hida Tunnel, the second longest road tunnel in Japan after the Kan-Etsu Tunnel. A total of 1.22 trillion yen was spent on planning and construction of the expressway over 36 years.

The expressway is 4 lanes from Ichinomiya Junction to Fukubegatake Parking Area, and 2 lanes on all other sections. Construction to expand the route to 4 lanes is currently underway on the section between Fukubegatake Parking Area and Shirotori Interchange. The speed limit is 80 km/h on 4-laned sections and 70 km/h on 2-laned sections.

Features

At 1,086 meters, Matsunoki Pass between Shōkawa Interchange and Hida-Kiyomi Interchange is the highest point in the national expressway network. A parking area is planned to open at this point.

There are a total of 54 tunnels either completed or under construction.  After the Hida Tunnel, the Hakamagoshi Tunnel (between Fukumitsu Interchange and Gokayama Interchange) is the longest. Trucks carrying hazardous materials are forbidden from using the tunnel and must use alternate routes.

The piers on the Washimi Bridge (between Shōkawa Interchange and Takasu Interchange) are the tallest in Japan, at 118 m.

List of interchanges and features

 IC - interchange, SIC - smart interchange, JCT - junction, SA - service area, PA - parking area, BS - bus stop, TN - tunnel, BR - bridge

Gallery

References

External links 
 Central Nippon Expressway Company
  Tōkai-Hokuriku Expressway Official Website

Expressways in Japan
Roads in Aichi Prefecture
Roads in Gifu Prefecture
Roads in Toyama Prefecture